Banshan Township, is a rural township in Liling City, Zhuzhou City, Hunan Province, People's Republic of China.

Administrative divisions 

The township is divided into 19 villages: Tuzhuling Village, Yangjiawan Village, Zhuhuashan Village, Shangping Village, Hongguang Village, Xiapingqiao Village, Changpokou Village, Huangtang Village, Dashiqiao Village, Gucheng Village, Gengjing Village, Liubiqiao Village, Dongchongpu Village, Tangjiachong Village, Leiguqiao Village, Babuqiao Village, Dawulong Village, Fengshuqiao Village, and Zhaixia Village.

References

External links

Divisions of Liling